A Total Waste of Makeup is a 2005 chick lit novel by Kim Gruenenfelder. The book was an international bestseller, spawning copies in six languages and eight international editions. The book follows Charlize "Charlie" Edwards, a personal assistant in Los Angeles to famed movie star Drew Stanton, and her adventures with her friends. A sequel to the novel, Misery Loves Cabernet, was released in 2009.

Reception
The book received generally favorable reviews from critics and audiences. Kirkus Reviews spoke positively in their review, stating, "The honesty of emotion they share is refreshing. Gruenenfelder’s debut supplies a splendid vacation from reality." The Library Journal praised the book for Gruenenfelder's Hollywood realism: "Gruenenfelder, a Hollywood screenwriter, knows her setting and her craft. Well-written characters and a wicked sense of humor help this debut stand above the usual chick-lit fare."

See also

 Kim Gruenenfelder
 Women's fiction
 Romantic comedy

References

2005 American novels
St. Martin's Press books
Chick lit novels